Taylor Cameron Upsahl (born November 28, 1998), known professionally as Upsahl (stylized as UPSAHL), is an American singer-songwriter and multi-instrumentalist. Her debut album, Lady Jesus, was released in 2021.

Early life 
Born and raised in Phoenix, Arizona, Upsahl started playing both the guitar and piano at the age of 5. She attended Arizona School for the Arts and is classically trained in piano, guitar, and voice.

Career 
Upsahl released a self-titled EP (as Taylor Upsahl) at age 14. In 2015, she wrote and self-produced her full-length debut album, "Viscerotonic." In 2017, her third album was released, "Unfamiliar Light." She quickly became a local favorite for national touring acts in Phoenix. Upsahl played the McDowell Mountain Music Festival in 2017, opening for The Shins, Beck, and Flume, and released her first single, "Can You Hear Me Now", that year. On March 8, 2019, she released her debut EP Hindsight 20/20 along with her single "Drugs."
She signed a recording deal with Arista Records in the summer of 2018. She was the first artist signed to the newly re-launched record label.

In 2020, Upsahl released the single "12345SEX". This was followed by the singles "People I Don't Like" and "MoneyOnMyMind", both songs were included on her second EP, Young Life Crisis. In 2021, she released the singles "Douchebag", "Melatonin", "Time of my Life", and "Lunatic". All songs are featured on her debut studio album, Lady Jesus, which was released October 8, 2021.

Upshal toured as an opening act for Olivia O'Brien in 2021 and for Yungblud in 2022.

Discography

Albums

Extended plays

Singles

As lead artist

As featured artist

Songwriting credits

References

External links 
 Upsahl in Twitter

1998 births
American women singer-songwriters
Living people
American singer-songwriters
21st-century American women
Phoenix
Artists from Phoenix, Arizona
Musicians from Phoenix, Arizona